The Flag of Udmurtia is one of the official state symbols of Udmurtia. The proportion of width and length of the flag is 1:2. It is a rectangular three-color cloth consisting of vertical equal stripes of black, white and red (from left to right) with an eight-pointed red cross. The black colour in the flag is a symbol of the earth and stability, red means the sun and life and white means a space and moral purity. The designer of the flag of the Udmurt Republic was Yuri Lobanov. The appropriate law N26-РЗ "On the National Flag of the Udmurt Republic" appeared on April 30, 2002.

The emblem
The cross/star symbol represents the solar sign, a protective symbol that according to folklore protects man from misfortunes.  The cross does not overlap the black and red stripes, and its size is such that it fits within a square whose side is equal to 5/6 of the width of one of the vertical stripes of the flag.  The width of the vertical and horizontal cross-bars of the solar sign is equal to one third of the side of this imaginary square. Each arm ends with two symmetrical teeth, the internal sides of which form a 90 degree angle where they meet, a vertex deepened towards the center of the sign at 1/2 arm width.

History

As the Udmurt ASSR 

The first flag of the Udmurt ASSR was described in the first Constitution of the Udmurt ASSR, which was adopted by the Central Executive Committee of the Udmurt ASSR on 14 March 1937, at the 2nd Extraordinary Congress of Soviets of the Udmurt ASSR. The flag was similar to the flag of the Russian SFSR at that time. The flag was a red flag, with the yellow inscription "RSFSR" in the left corner of the flag, and the inscription "Udmurt A.S.S.R." in Russian and Udmurt.

On March 29, 1954, by the decision of the Presidium of the Supreme Council of the Udmurt ASSR, a new state flag of the Udmurt ASSR was adopted, which was approved by the Law of the Udmurt ASSR of July 8, 1954. The flag is still similar with the flag of the RSFSR. The flag had a length-to-width ratio of one to two (1:2). The flag was a red flag, with a light-blue stripe at the pole extending all the  height which constitutes  length of the flag. In the upper corner of the flag, there was a hammer and sickle. Below the hammer and sickle were the letters “УАССР” in yellow.

The inscriptions changed after the adoption of a new constitution on May 31, 1978. The inscription “УАССР”  was changed with the inscription "Udmurt ASSR" in Russian and Udmurt languages.

Pre-national revival flag 
Prior to the national revival in Udmurtia, the national movements in the Udmurt ASSR used a white flag with red and black stripes on the bottom edge, with a black ideogram on a white field. The flag was designed by Kasim Galikhanov.

National revival 

During the glasnost period in the Soviet Union, many of the ASSRs in the Soviet Union began a process of national revival. In Udmurtia itself, the first official flag of Udmurtia was adopted in the 1st All-Union Congress of the Udmurts, organized by the Society of the Udmurt Culture. The flag consisted of three horizontal stripes - red, black and white. The flag was based on a famous poem by Udmurt national poet V. Vladykin Why does a tyuragai sing.
There are three great colors:
Red, black, and white.
The sun is red
The earth is black
The white light covers all.

Proposed flags
Designs by V. Kovalchukov and E. Shumilov which sought to combine the Udmurt national colours with the Russian tricolour.

Other designs
Extra designs for the Udmurt flag by Yuri Lobanov. The current flag was among many similar designs submitted by Lobanov.

See also
Auseklis
Flag of Mordovia

References

Citations

Bibliography

External links

Culture of Udmurtia
Udmurtia
Udmurtia
Udmurtia